Samir Rauf oghlu Sharifov (born 7 September 1961) is an Azerbaijani politician serving as the Minister of Finance of Azerbaijan Republic.

Early life
Sharifov was born on 7 September 1961. In 1983, he graduated from Kiev State University with a Master's degree in International Economic Relations. In 1983-1991, he worked for Soviet governmental organizations dealing with international economic relations and was based first in Baku, then in Yemen.

Political career
In 1991-1995, Sharifov worked as Deputy Chief of Department of International Economic Relations at the Ministry of Foreign Affairs of Azerbaijan. From 1995 through 2001, he was a department director at the Central Bank of Azerbaijan. On 3 January 2001 he was appointed Executive Director of State Oil Fund of Azerbaijan by President Heydar Aliyev. From 2003 until 2006, he also chaired the State Commission on Transparency for Exploitation of Natural Resources and Manufacturing Sector. On 18 April 2006 Sharifov was replaced by Shahmar Movsumov and was appointed Minister of Finance of Azerbaijan. 

In addition to being a minister, Sharifov is a member of the supervisory board of the Oil Fund of Azerbaijan and is a co-chair at Black Sea Trade and Development Bank representing the Azerbaijani side. He also attends meeting of Election Group of IMF and World Bank every year.

Samir Sharifov was appointed Minister of Finance in composition of the Cabinet of Ministers on 21 April 2018.

Sharifov is married and has two children.

See also
Cabinet of Azerbaijan

References 

1961 births
Finance ministers of Azerbaijan
Government ministers of Azerbaijan
Living people